I am Sam is a 2007 South Korean television series starring Yang Dong-geun, Park Min-young, Park Jun-gyu, Son Tae-young, and Choi Seung-hyun in his acting debut. It aired on KBS2 from August 6 to October 2, 2007, on Mondays and Tuesdays at 21:55 (KST) time slot for 16 episodes. Based on the Japanese comic series Kyōkasho ni Nai! (in English, Not in a Textbook! or Very Private Lesson), Yang plays a geeky, straight-arrowed, under-qualified high school teacher who becomes a live-in tutor for the troublemaking daughter of a notorious gangster, in exchange for one million won.

The title is a word play since sam in Korean roughly translates to "teacher" in slang, thus the international title, I am Your Teacher.

Synopsis
Yoo Jae-gon (Park Jun-gyu), head of an infamous gangster organization, becomes troubled by the future prospects of his only daughter, Eun-byul (Park Min-young), who refuses to study. Then coincidence or fate brings together Eun-byul and goofy-looking high school teacher Jang Yi-san (Yang Dong-geun) in a somewhat sticky situation. After finding out that Yi-san can actually inspire his troublesome daughter to focus on her studies, Jae-gon offers a deal to Yi-san: become his daughter's private tutor in exchange for one million won. The catch is Yi-san has to move in with her. And the money? It's given as security for his own life.

Cast

Main
 Yang Dong-geun as Jang Yi-san 
 Park Min-young as Yoo Eun-byul 
 Son Tae-young as Shin So-yi
 Park Jun-gyu as Yoo Jae-gon (Eun-byul's father)
 Choi Seung-hyun as Chae Moo-shin

Supporting
 Park Chae-kyung as Min Sa-kang (Eun-byul's friend)
 Park Jae-jung as Kim Woo-jin (Mr. Yoo's right-hand man)
 Jo Hyang-ki as Hong Dae-ri (Mr. Yoo's assistant)
 Kwak Ji-min as Da-bin
 Dan Ji as Ye-bin
 Ban So-young as Hyo-bin
 Lee Min-ho as Heo Mo-se (Principal's son)
 Choi Jae-hwan as Han Tae-sung (Moo-shin's friend)
 Park Chul-ho as Kim In-seol
 Kim Yoo-bin as Kim Hee-chul
 Joo Jong-hyuk as Ji Seon-hoo
 Kim Hong-shik as Park Nam-kyu
 Yoo Tae-woong as Go Dong-sool
 Choi Joo-bong as Heo Deok-bae (Principal)
 Park Sang-hyun as Park Han-suk
 Shin Pyo as Kang Ha

Reception
I Am Sam received average viewership ratings of around 6.5%.

Awards
 2007 KBS Drama Awards: Best New Actress - Park Min-young

Source material
 Title: 
 Original story: Kazuto Okada (岡田和人)
 Genre: Comedy, Romance
 Age rating: 10+

Oraku is a lucky man... He has a comfortable job teaching at a local high school. He has Satsuki, a fellow teacher whom he hopes to marry someday.

He has Aya, a beautiful student who has fallen in love with him. He has Aya's father, a wealthy man who wants so much for his little girl to be happy that he has sent her to live with Oraku.

Oraku is a very lucky man. Of course Aya loves nothing more than to come on to Oraku by lounging around his apartment half naked. Unfortunately for Oraku, Aya's father happens to be wealthy because he is a major crime boss, and he will have Oraku slowly murdered if Aya doesn't remain absolutely pure.

Now Oraku must not only restrain himself, but also protect Aya from the hordes of men and women at school...

And of course, if Satsuki or any of the other teachers find out that Oraku is living with one of his students, he will be permanently dismissed from the teaching profession.

See also
 List of Korean television shows
 Contemporary culture of South Korea
 Big Bang (South Korean band)

References

External links
 I Am Sam official KBS website 
 
 
 

Korean Broadcasting System television dramas
2007 South Korean television series debuts
2007 South Korean television series endings
Korean-language television shows
South Korean romantic comedy television series
Television series by Pan Entertainment